The Heptarchy were the seven petty kingdoms of Anglo-Saxon England that flourished from the Anglo-Saxon settlement of Britain in the 5th century until they were consolidated in the 8th century into the four kingdoms of Mercia, Northumbria, Wessex and East Anglia.

The first known written     reference to the historiographical traditional belief that there were these 'seven kingdoms' was in Henry of Huntingdon’s 12th century work, Historia Anglorum; the term Heptarchy is not known to have been used to describe them until the 16th century.

History

By convention, the Heptarchy period lasted from the end of Roman rule in Britain in the 5th century, until most of the Anglo-Saxon kingdoms came under the overlordship of Egbert of Wessex in 829. This approximately 400-year period of European history is often referred to as the Early Middle Ages or, more controversially, as the Dark Ages.
Although heptarchy suggests the existence of seven kingdoms, the term is just used as a label of convenience and does not imply the existence of a clear-cut or stable group of seven kingdoms. The number of kingdoms and sub-kingdoms fluctuated rapidly during this period as competing kings contended for supremacy. 

In the late 6th century, the king of Kent was a prominent lord in the south. In the 7th century, the rulers of Northumbria and Wessex were powerful. In the 8th century, Mercia achieved hegemony over the other surviving kingdoms, particularly during the reign of Offa the Great. Yet, as late as the reigns of Eadwig and Edgar (955–75), it was still possible to speak of separate kingdoms within the English population.

Alongside the seven kingdoms, a number of other political divisions also existed, such as the kingdoms (or sub-kingdoms) of: Bernicia and Deira within Northumbria; Lindsey in present-day Lincolnshire; the Hwicce in the southwest Midlands; the Magonsæte or Magonset, a sub-kingdom of Mercia in what is now Herefordshire; the Wihtwara, a Jutish kingdom on the Isle of Wight, originally as important as the Cantwara of Kent; the Middle Angles, a group of tribes based around modern Leicestershire, later conquered by the Mercians; the Hæstingas (around the town of Hastings in Sussex); and the Gewisse, a Saxon tribe in what is now southern Hampshire that later developed into the kingdom of Wessex.

The decline of the Heptarchy and the eventual emergence of the kingdom of England was a drawn-out process, taking place over the course of the 9th to 10th centuries. In the 9th century, the  Danish enclave at York expanded into the Danelaw, with about half of England under Danish rule.
English unification under  Alfred the Great was a reaction to the threat from this common enemy.  In 886, Alfred retook London, and the Anglo-Saxon Chronicle says that "all of the English people (all Angelcyn) not subject to the Danes submitted themselves to King Alfred."

The unification of the kingdom of England was complete only in the 10th century, following the expulsion of Eric Bloodaxe as king of Northumbria. Æthelstan is credited as the first to be King of all England.

List of Anglo-Saxon kingdoms

The four main kingdoms in Anglo-Saxon England were:

 East Anglia
 Mercia
 Northumbria, including sub-kingdoms Bernicia and Deira
 Wessex

The other main kingdoms, which were conquered by others entirely at some point in their history, before the unification of England, are:

 Essex
 Kent
 Sussex

Other minor kingdoms and territories:

 Bernicia 
 Deira
 Dumnonia (only annexed to Wessex at a later date, and a Cornish kingdom)
 Haestingas
 The Hwicce
 Kingdom of the Iclingas, a precursor state to Mercia
 Lindsey
 Magonsæte
 The Meonwara, a Jutish tribe in Hampshire
 Middle Angles
 Middle Saxons (Middlesex, subsequently absorbed by the Kingdom of Essex)
 Pecsæte
 Rheged
 Surrey
 Tomsæte
 Wreocensæte
 Wihtwara

See also 

History of Anglo-Saxon England
Cornovii (Cornish)
Related terms: Bretwalda, High King for hegemons among kings
Compare: Tetrarchy
Five Burghs

References

Bibliography
Westermann Großer Atlas zur Weltgeschichte
 Campbell, J. et al. The Anglo-Saxons (Penguin, 1991).
 Sawyer, Peter Hayes. From Roman Britain to Norman England (Routledge, 2002).
 Stenton, F. M. Anglo-Saxon England (3rd edition. Oxford U. P. 1971).

External links

 Monarchs of Britain, Encyclopædia Britannica
 ogdoad.force9.co.uk: The Burghal Hidage – Wessex's fortified burhs

 
States and territories established in the 5th century
States and territories disestablished in the 8th century
Historiography of England
Former subdivisions of England
Barbarian kingdoms
7 (number)